Chorabali is a 2016 Bengali Suspense Thriller film directed by Subhrajit Mitra and produced by Pradip Churiwal, starring Barun Chanda, June Malia, Sayani Datta and Shataf Figar. The film is based on Agatha Christie's novel Cards on the Table.

Plot
The story line inter tangles with the idea of perfect crime, as well as basic instincts of human emotions Greed, lust for power. It is a who-dunnit thriller, set in the backdrop of Kolkata with its British Raj charm. A doctor is killed in a house party while all the guests are playing cards. Criminologist Professor Ardhendu and Police officer Vishnu investigate the case with crime writer Tilottama. It reveals that victim knows every suspect's dark past.

Cast
 Barun Chanda as Ardhendu Chatterjee
 June Malia as Debolina
 George Baker as Dr. Dasgupta
 Tanusree Chakraborty as Tilottama
 Shataf Figar as Vishnu
 Locket Chatterjee as Madhurima Sen
 Sayani Datta
 Malobika Banerjee as Elina
 Dipanjan Basak
 Tathagata Banerjee
 Mou Baidya

Release
 Chorabali was released on 22 January 2016 in West Bengal under the banner of Macneill Engineering.

References

External links
 
 Official Trailer
 http://www.filmipop.com/movies/chorabali-movie-10384
 Shooting News

Bengali-language Indian films
2010s Bengali-language films
2016 films
Indian detective films
Indian mystery thriller films
Films based on works by Agatha Christie